The  is a Class B river in Kanagawa Prefecture, Japan.

The mouth of the river is known unagi spawning.

Geography
The source of the Hikiji River is Izumi no Mori (literally "Forest of Springs"), a park located in near the center of the Sagamino plateau in the Kamisōyagi area of Yamato in Kanagawa Prefecture, Japan. The park area was formed from the erosion of the diluvial plateau by the waters flowing south from the springs, forming a valley.

It flows through the Inari neighborhood Shōnan dunes Fujisawa City and through Shōnan Kaigan Park in the Kugenuma-Kaigan neighborhood before emptying into Sagami Bay.

The watershed includes portions of six cities, including Fujisawa, Chigasaki, Yamato, Ebina, Zama, and Ayase. The  of the upper reach of the river down to Kanagawa Prefectural Route 45 Maruko Nakayama Chigasaki Route is considered a small, local river, and is under the management of the city of Yamato. From that point, it is considered a Class B river and under the management of Kanagawa Prefecture.

The main tributaries are the Tate, Fudō, Isshiki, and Koito Rivers.

The middle part of the river flows across the bottom of the valley where it is used for rice paddies and other agricultural purposes. In order to draw water from the river, the city of Yamato established the Wakamiya Intake, and the city of Fujisawa built the Chōgo Sluice, the Nakamura Sluice, and the Ishikawa Sluice.

The river formerly meandered significantly where it exited the Shōnan Sand Dunes, changing location every time the river channel flooded. At the beginning of the Shōwa period, the current river channel was created through manual labor. Because the coastal current in Sagami Bay flows east where the Hikiji River flows into the bay, maps created during the Edo period show a confluence with the Sakai River.

Features
The  opened on May 6, 1983. The installation of municipal sewer systems and volunteer efforts to clean up garbage helped to noticeably improve the water quality along the river.

References

External links

Rivers of Kanagawa Prefecture
Geography of Kanagawa Prefecture
Rivers of Japan